Pascal Riché (born June 1962) is a French journalist, co-founder of Rue 89 along with Arnaud Aubron, Laurent Mauriac, and Pierre Haski. He is currently the deputy editor of L'Obs (previously known as Le Nouvel Observateur)

Life 

Pascal Riché is a former alumnus of Sciences Po and of the Centre de formation des journalistes (CFJ) journalism school. He started his journalistic career in Ouest-France, the largest regional newspaper in France, and La Tribune de l'Economie, before joining Libération in 1989. There, he headed the economy service until 2000, when he was named Washington bureau chief (2000–2006). He then became Op-ed editor of the daily.

Following the crisis at Libération, Riché resigned from his functions and co-founded the Internet newspaper Rue 89 in March 2007.

He also has been a columnist  for several media : DS magazine, TPMCafe, France Culture, Radio Nova.

He is the son of the medievalist historian Pierre Riché.

Bibliography
He is the author of L'union monétaire de l'Europe, with Charles Wyplosz, and La Guerre de Sept ans, histoire secrète du franc fort 1989-1996 with Eric Aeschimann, which earned the 1997 Turgot Prize of the Best economic book of the year.

External links

his former blog
Libération website
Rue89.com website

1962 births
Living people
Sciences Po alumni
French journalists
French male non-fiction writers